The name Orelli can refer to several different people:

Carlo Orelli (1894–2005) was, until his death, the oldest living Italian veteran of World War I
Johann Caspar von Orelli (1787–1849), Swiss classical scholar
Johann Conrad Orelli (1770–1826), cousin to the preceding, and also a classics scholar
Hans Konrad von Orelli (1846–1912), Swiss theologian